John Dunning Stivers (August 30, 1861 in Middletown, Orange County, New York – February 24, 1935 in Middletown, Orange Co., NY) was an American newspaper publisher and politician from New York.

Life
He was the son of Congressman Moses D. Stivers (1828–1895) and Mary Elizabeth (Stewart) Stivers.

On April 29, 1891, he began publishing with his brother Lewis S. Stivers a new Republican newspaper in Middletown: the Daily Times. In 1897, he was appointed as a Trustee of the Middletown State Homeopathic Hospital. On September 17, 1908, he married Louise M. Greene, and they had three children.

Stivers was a member of the New York State Assembly (Orange Co., 2nd D.) in 1910, 1911 and 1912; and was Chairman of the Committee on Public Printing in 1912.

He was a member of the New York State Senate (25th D.) from 1913 to 1918, sitting in the 136th, 137th, 138th, 139th, 140th and 141st New York State Legislatures.

He was found dead at his desk in his newspaper office early on the morning of February 24, 1935, in Middletown, Orange County, New York; and was buried at the Hillside Cemetery there.

Sources
 Official New York from Cleveland to Hughes by Charles Elliott Fitch (Hurd Publishing Co., New York and Buffalo, 1911, Vol. IV; pg. 359 and 361)
 A NEW REPUBLICAN ORGAN in NYT on April 30, 1891 
 NEW YORK LEGISLATURE; Nominations by Governor... in NYT on March 4, 1897
 STIVERS DEFENDS HIS MILITARY LAW in NYT on November 5, 1916
 JOHN D. STIVERS in NYT on February 25, 1935 (subscription required)

External links

1861 births
1935 deaths
Republican Party New York (state) state senators
People from Middletown, Orange County, New York
Republican Party members of the New York State Assembly
19th-century American newspaper editors
Journalists from New York (state)